In complex analysis, the monodromy theorem is an important result about analytic continuation of a complex-analytic function to a larger set. The idea is that one can extend a complex-analytic function (from here on called simply analytic function)  along curves starting in the original domain of the function and ending in the larger set. A potential problem of this analytic continuation along a curve strategy is there are usually many curves which end up at the same point in the larger set. The monodromy theorem gives sufficient conditions for analytic continuation to give the same value at a given point regardless of the curve used to get there, so that the resulting extended analytic function is well-defined and single-valued. 

Before stating this theorem it is necessary to define analytic continuation along a curve and study its properties.

Analytic continuation along a curve

The definition of analytic continuation along a curve is a bit technical, but the basic idea is that one starts with an analytic function defined around a point, and one extends that function along a curve via analytic functions defined on small overlapping disks covering that curve.

Formally, consider a curve (a continuous function)  Let  be an analytic function  defined on an open disk  centered at  An analytic continuation of the pair  along  is a collection of pairs  for  such that

  and 

 For each  there exists  such that for all  with  one has that  (which implies that  and  have a non-empty intersection) and the functions  and  coincide on the intersection

Properties of analytic continuation along a curve

Monodromy theorem

As noted earlier, two analytic continuations along the same curve yield the same result at the curve's endpoint. However, given two different curves branching out from the same point around which an analytic function is defined, with the curves reconnecting at the end, it is not true in general that the analytic continuations of that function along the two curves will yield the same value at their common endpoint. 

The values of the logarithm at  obtained by analytic continuation along these two arcs will differ by 

If, however, one can continuously deform one of the curves into another while keeping the starting points and ending points fixed, and analytic continuation is possible on each of the intermediate curves, then the analytic continuations along the two curves will yield the same results at their common endpoint. This is called the monodromy theorem and its statement is made precise below.

 Let  be an open disk in the complex plane centered at a point  and  be a complex-analytic function. Let  be another point in the complex plane.

The monodromy theorem makes it possible to extend an analytic function to a larger set via curves connecting a point in the original domain of the function to points in the larger set. The theorem below which states that is also called the monodromy theorem. 

 Let  be an open disk in the complex plane centered at a point  and  be a complex-analytic function.

See also
Analytic continuation
 Monodromy

References

External links

 Monodromy theorem at MathWorld
 
 Monodromy theorem at the Encyclopaedia of Mathematics

Theorems in complex analysis